Friedrich von Löwen (5 July 1654 – 9 July 1744) was a Baltic German in Russian Empire military service, also a statesman.

In 1710 he left from Swedish military service in favour of Russian military service. 1711–1730 he was vice-governor of Governorate of Estonia, and 1728–1736 General-Governor of this governorate.

References

1654 births
1744 deaths
Military personnel of the Russian Empire
Governors of the Russian Empire governorates
Baltic-German people
People from Lääne-Nigula Parish